The 2000 WNBA Championship was the championship series of the 2000 WNBA season, and the conclusion of the season's playoffs. The Houston Comets, second-seeded champions of the Western Conference, defeated the New York Liberty, first-seeded champions of the Eastern Conference, two games to none in a best-of-three series. This was Houston's fourth title.

The Comets made their fourth appearance in the Finals in franchise history. The Liberty also made their third Finals appearance.

Going into the series, no other team except the Houston Comets had won a WNBA championship (1997–1999).

The Comets had a 27–5 record (.844), good enough to receive home-court advantage over the Liberty (20–12). It did not matter, however, as the Comets swept the Liberty.

Road to the finals

Regular season series
The Comets and the Liberty split the regular season series:

Game summaries
All times listed below are Eastern Daylight Time.

Game 1

Game 2

Awards
2000 WNBA Champion: Houston Comets
Finals MVP: Cynthia Cooper

Rosters

{| class="toccolours" style="font-size: 95%; width: 100%;"
|-
! colspan="2" style="background-color: #B22222; color: #D3D3D3; text-align: center;" | 2000 Houston Comets Finals roster
|- style="background-color: #D3D3D3;color: #FFFFFF; text-align: center;"
! Players !! Coaches
|-
| valign="top" |
{| class="sortable" style="background:transparent; margin:0px; width:100%;"
! Pos. !! # !! Nat. !! Name !! Height !! Weight !!class="unsortable"| !! From
|-

{| class="toccolours" style="font-size: 95%; width: 100%;"
|-
! colspan="2" style="background-color: #0047AB; color: #FFFFFF; text-align: center;" | 2000 New York Liberty Finals roster
|- style="background-color: #66CDAA;color: #FF4500; text-align: center;"
! Players !! Coaches
|-
| valign="top" |
{| class="sortable" style="background:transparent; margin:0px; width:100%;"
! Pos. !! # !! Nat. !! Name !! Height !! Weight !!class="unsortable"| !! From
|-

External links

Finals
Houston Comets
New York Liberty
WNBA Finals
WNBA Finals
Women's National Basketball Association Finals
WNBA Finals
WNBA Finals
Basketball competitions in Houston
Basketball competitions in New York City
2000s in Manhattan